Keirosoma is a genus of flies in the family Dolichopodidae. It is distributed in the New World. The subfamily has variously been placed in the Rhaphiinae, Diaphorinae or Sympycninae. According to Scott E. Brooks in 2005, the systematic position of the genus is still uncertain, though a possible relationship with Pseudohercostomus has been suggested.

Species
Keirosoma albicinctum Van Duzee, 1929
Keirosoma slossonae Van Duzee, 1933

References

Dolichopodidae genera
Diaphorinae
Diptera of South America